Appalachian Incantation is the fourth studio album by the stoner rock band Karma to Burn. Succeeding 2001's Almost Heathen, Appalachian Incantation was the band's first studio release after a seven-year hiatus that lasted from 2002 to 2009.  The album was released on April 30, 2010 by Napalm Records, and later reissued in 2022 by Heavy Psych Sounds Records.

Like their previous two releases, Appalachian Incantation is largely an instrumental album, although one track features vocals from Daniel Davies of Year Long Disaster. There is also a version with limited edition bonus disc entitled Cat Got Your Tongue EP.  The bonus disc includes remastered rarities and re-recordings, one of which is a vocal track featuring John Garcia of Kyuss.

Background
Karma to Burn dissolved in 2002 due to a confrontation between band members Rich Mullins and William Mecum regarding the former’s heroin addiction. After leaving Karma to Burn, Mullins first joined Speedealer, and then co-founded Year Long Disaster with musician Daniel Davies.  During the seven-year break, Mullins hoped for a Karma to Burn reunion, but did nothing to make it happen, ascertaining that the reunion could only happen if he reconciled with Mecum.

In 2009, both Mecum and Mullins reconciled, and reformed the group to record a new album. Mecum and Year Long Disaster frontman Davies had been writing songs together, and wrote one called “Waiting on the Western World”, which was only the second of their collaborations (the first was a song for Year Long Disaster called “Seven of Swords”). Enjoying the writing process for the song, Mecum brought “Waiting on the Western World” to a Karma to Burn rehearsal, and it was decided to use the song on the band’s upcoming record - as well as to eventually make a Karma to Burn album featuring vocals and lyrics on every song, with Mullins stating the band’s hope for it to result in something better than their debut album.

Track listing

Standard release

Cat Got Our Tongue EP (limited edition bonus disc)

Personnel 
 William Mecum – guitar
 Rich Mullins – bass
 Rob Oswald – drums
 Daniel Davies – vocals ("Waiting on the Western World")
 John Garcia – vocals ("Two Times")

References 

2010 albums
Karma to Burn albums
Napalm Records albums
Instrumental rock albums